RK Bjelovar (Rukometni Klub Bjelovar) is a team handball club from Bjelovar, Croatia formed in 1955. The club currently competes in the Croatian Second League of Handball (North) and the Croatian Handball Cup.

During Communist Yugoslavia, the club was known as Partizan, named after the Second World War's Yugoslav Partisans. After Croatian independence in 1991, the current name was adopted. Despite being the most successful club in Yugoslavia, it has had little success since the 1980 season and has been thoroughly eclipsed by RK Zagreb in modern Croatian handball.

Accomplishments
National Championship of Yugoslavia: 9
1958, 1961, 1967, 1968, 1970, 1971, 1972, 1977, 1979
EHF Champions League:
1972
EHF Champions League Finalist:
1962, 1973
EHF Champions League Semifinalist:
1968, 1971

Players 
 Hrvoje Horvat
 Albin Vidović
 Vladimir Smiljanić-Babura
 Miroslav Pribanić
 Željko Nimš
 Zvonimir Serdarušić
 Boris Bradić
 Pavle Jurina
 Mirko Bašić
 Željko Vidaković
 Rastko Stefanović
 Dalibor Sokač
 Goran Šoštarec
 Antonio Pribanić
 Mario Vuglač
 Mohsen Karamian
 Miroslav Milinović

Famous coaches 
 Željko Seleš
 Ante Kostelić (father of Janica Kostelić and Ivica Kostelić)

External links
Official website of RK Bjelovar (Croatian)

Croatian handball clubs
Handball clubs established in 1955
Sport in Bjelovar
1955 establishments in Croatia